Kenneth Gordon Stewart (born 9 September 1955) is an Australian former professional rugby league footballer who played for the South Sydney Rabbitohs and the Parramatta Eels.

Biography
Manchester born Stewart was a regular fixture in the South Sydney first-grade side from 1977 to 1983, during which time he served as one of the club's captains. He amassed a total of 145 premiership games, with one finals appearance in 1980. Stewart, who played as a hooker, finished his career with two seasons at Parramatta.

Stewart remained involved in rugby league after retiring, coaching the Moss Vale Dragons in 1993 and 1994. He is a former CEO of the South Sydney Leagues Club.

References

External links
Ken Stewart at Rugby League project

1955 births
Living people
English emigrants to Australia
English rugby league players
Parramatta Eels players
People educated at Matraville Sports High School
Rugby league hookers
Rugby league players from Manchester
South Sydney Rabbitohs players
South Sydney Rabbitohs captains